Tommy Wood (17 February 1912 – 21 January 2003) was a Grand Prix motorcycle road racer. He competed in his first Manx Grand Prix in 1937.

References

1912 births
2003 deaths
British motorcycle racers
250cc World Championship riders
350cc World Championship riders
500cc World Championship riders
Isle of Man TT riders